Fabio Gjonikaj (born 25 May 1995) is an Albanian football goalkeeper who plays for Kosovan side Vushtrria.

Club career
He spent several years on loan at Kamza from Partizani Tirana.

References 

1995 births
Living people
People from Pukë
Association football goalkeepers
Albanian footballers
Albania youth international footballers
FK Partizani Tirana players
FC Kamza players
KF Vushtrria players
Kategoria Superiore players
Kategoria e Parë players
Kategoria e Dytë players
Albanian expatriate footballers
Expatriate footballers in Kosovo
Albanian expatriate sportspeople in Kosovo